Westurrection is the eighth studio album by American rap group South Central Cartel.

Track listing 
 Intro
 Where da Enemies At
 Act Like Ya Know
 Cali Game
 South Central (featuring Kokane)
 Front Row
 Flash & Cash (featuring Bad Azz)
 Y-U-Hatin
 The Cartel Wayee
 Damn
 I'll Take Her
 Guess Who's Back
 Yes Sir
 Back on da Grind
 Westurrection
 Make It Bang
 I'm Feelin U
 Wifey
 Flash & Cash (Remix)

2005 albums
South Central Cartel albums
Albums produced by Prodeje